The Simmons Island Beach House is located in Simmons Island Park in Kenosha, Wisconsin. It was added to the National Register of Historic Places in 2003.

Land for the Simmons Island Park was donated in 1916 by industrialist Zalmon G. Simmons.  In the 1930s, landscaping was done and the beach house was constructed.

The building is one-and-a-half-stories in its central block and has one-story wings.  It has steep slate-covered roofs.

History
The structure was once used as a public bath house. In 2008, an entrepreneur bought the building with plans to transform it into a restaurant and installed a concession stand.

References

Park buildings and structures on the National Register of Historic Places in Wisconsin
Former public baths
Buildings and structures in Kenosha, Wisconsin
Tudor Revival architecture in Wisconsin
Public baths on the National Register of Historic Places
National Register of Historic Places in Kenosha County, Wisconsin
Public baths in the United States